Robert Leonard Miller (31 October 1923 – 19 August 1993) was an Australian rules footballer who played for Fitzroy in the Victorian Football League (VFL) during the late 1940s.

Miller, originally from East Brunswick, spent five seasons at Fitzroy. He played the first couple of years under 1944 premiership captain-coach Fred Hughson and although Miller took part in losing 1947 Preliminary Final side, the club were on the decline.

He then became a successful coach in Tasmania, steering City-South to premierships and in 2002 was announced as coach of their official 'Team of the Century'. Miller was also an inaugural inductee into the Tasmanian Football Hall of Fame, in 2005.

References

Holmesby, Russell and Main, Jim (2007). The Encyclopedia of AFL Footballers. 7th ed. Melbourne: Bas Publishing.

1923 births
1993 deaths
Fitzroy Football Club players
City-South Football Club coaches
Australian rules footballers from Victoria (Australia)
Tasmanian Football Hall of Fame inductees